Sulphur Springs High School is a public high school located in Sulphur Springs, Texas, United States and classified as a 4A school by the University Interscholastic League (UIL).  It is part of the Sulphur Springs Independent School District located in central Hopkins County.  In 2013, the school was rated "Met Standard" by the Texas Education Agency.

Athletics
The Sulphur Springs Wildcats compete in the following sports -

Cross Country, Volleyball, Football, Basketball, Powerlifting, Soccer, Golf, Tennis, Track, Softball & Baseball

State titles
Football 
2008(4A/D2)

Extracurricular activities
Sulphur Springs High School Students also participate in some of the following activities - 
band, drill team, athletics, & UIL

Notable alumni

Keenan Clayton, former professional football player
Forrest Gregg, former professional football player and coach. Inducted into the Pro Football Hall of Fame in 1977.
Tyreo Harrison, former professional football player
Damione Lewis, former professional football player
Caleb Miller, former professional football player
Darroh Sudderth, former lead singer of the progressive metal band Fair to Midland
Colby Suggs, baseball player and coach

References

External links
Sulphur Springs ISD

Public high schools in Texas
Schools in Hopkins County, Texas